Blur may refer to:

Optics and images
 Bokeh, the aesthetic quality of the out-of-focus parts of an image
 Box blur, a graphic-art effect
 Defocus aberration, blurring of an image due to incorrect focus
 Gaussian blur, a graphic-art effect
 Motion blur, blurring of an image due to movement of the subject or imaging system

Arts, entertainment, and media

Fictional characters
 Red Blue Blur, or The Blur, an alternate identity for Clark Kent in Smallville
 The Atlanta Blur or The Blur, a character in the Marvel MAX comic Supreme Power

Films
 Blurred (film), a 2002 Australian film
 Blurs (film), a 2011 Croatian film
 Blurr (film), a 2022 Indian horror thriller film by Ajay Bahl

Music
 Blur (band), an English rock band
 Blur (Blur album), a 1997 album by the band
 Blur: The Best Of, a 2000 album by the band
 Blur (Rachael Lampa album), a 2002 album by Rachael Lampa
 "Blur", a song by Britney Spears from the album Circus
 "Blur", a song by Imagine Dragons, from Mercury – Acts 1 & 2
 "Blur", a song by Johnny Orlando
 "Blur", a song by MØ from the album Forever Neverland
 "Blur", a song by We Came As Romans, from their self-titled album
 "Blur", a song by Wretch 32, featured on the soundtrack of FIFA 13

Other uses in arts, entertainment, and media
 Blur (video game), a 2010 arcade racing game
 Blur: How to Know What's True in the Age of Information Overload, a book by journalists Tom Rosenstiel and Bill Kovach
 The Blur, a member of DP 7, part of Marvel Comics' New Universe line

Other uses
 Blur, in computing, a loss of focus
 Blurring, a form of trademark dilution
 Blur Group, an online marketplace provider
 Blur Studio, a graphics and video effects company

See also
 Blurr, several fictional robot superhero characters from the Transformers robot superhero franchise.
 Motoblur, a custom Android UI developed by Motorola